Santa Cruz de Grío is a municipality located in the province of Zaragoza, Aragon, Spain. According to the 2010 census, the municipality has a population of 164 inhabitants.

This town is located between the Sierra de Vicort and the Sierra de Algairén in the Grio River valley.

The abandoned village of Aldehuela de Grío, also known as  Aldehuela de Santa Cruz, is located within its municipal term.

See also
List of municipalities in Zaragoza

References

External links

Santa Cruz de Grío Town Hall

Municipalities in the Province of Zaragoza